The Good Wife is an American television legal and political drama series that aired on CBS from September 22, 2009, to May 8, 2016. Created by Robert and Michelle King, the show follows Alicia Florrick (Julianna Margulies), wife to disgraced and imprisoned politician Peter Florrick (Chris Noth), who begins working at the law firm Stern Lockhart Gardner after 13 years of not practicing law. Rounding out the main cast are Matt Czuchry, Archie Panjabi, Graham Phillips, Makenzie Vega, Alan Cumming, Zach Grenier, Matthew Goode, Josh Charles and Christine Baranski.

The Good Wife has garnered critical praise for the performances of the casts, most notably Margulies, the series' storylines, and its use of technology.  Since its premiere in September 2009, the series has been nominated for 43 Primetime Emmy Awards (winning five), 14 Golden Globe Awards (winning one), 12 Satellite Awards, 9 SAG Awards (winning two), 6 TCA Awards (winning two) and 22 Critics' Choice Television Awards (winning two), among others. 

Margulies stands as the most decorated cast member, winning two Emmy Awards, a Golden Globe Award, a TCA Award and two SAG Awards for her role as Alicia Florrick, as well as receiving the most award nominations. Principal cast members Baranski, Charles, Cumming and Panjabi have also received award nominations for their respective roles as well as several recurring actors, most notably Martha Plimpton, Dylan Baker, Michael J. Fox and Carrie Preston.

Awards and nominations

Critics' Choice Television Awards
Awarded since 2011, the Critics' Choice Television Award is an annual accolade presented by the Broadcast Television Journalists Association (BTJA) in recognition of outstanding achievements in television. The Good Wife has been nominated for Best Drama Series every year since 2011, as has Julianna Margulies been nominated for Best Actress in a Drama Series, winning once at the 1st Critics' Choice Television Awards. Christine Baranski received a nomination for Best Supporting Actress in a Drama Series in 2012, 2014, and 2015 while Carrie Preston was nominated for Best Guest Performer in a Drama Series from 2012-2014.

Emmy Awards
The Primetime Emmy Award is an annual accolade presented by the Academy of Television Arts & Sciences for outstanding achievement in American prime time television programming. The Primetime Emmy Award recognizes outstanding achievement in aspects such as acting, writing, and direction while the more technical aspects such as cinematography, casting and, as of 2011, guest acting performances in television, are awarded at the Creative Arts Emmy Awards. Out of 39 nominations, The Good Wife has won five, all for acting. Julianna Margulies won the award for Outstanding Lead Actress in a Drama Series in 2011 and 2014. Archie Panjabi won the award for Outstanding Supporting Actress in a Drama Series in 2010. Martha Plimpton won the award for Outstanding Guest Actress in a Drama Series in 2012 while Carrie Preston won the same award in 2013. Christine Baranski is the only actress on The Good Wife to receive an Emmy nomination for all of the series' first six seasons, all for Outstanding Supporting Actress in a Drama Series.

Primetime Emmy Awards

Creative Arts Emmy Awards

Golden Globe Awards
Presented since 1949, the Golden Globe Award is an annual accolade awarded by the Hollywood Foreign Press Association for outstanding achievements in film and television. Out of 14 nominations, The Good Wife won one award for Best Actress – Television Series Drama awarded to Julianna Margulies.

Online Film & Television Association

People's Choice Awards

The People's Choice Awards are an annual awards show, presented since 1975, which recognize the people and work of popular culture. The Good Wife won the award for Favorite Network TV Drama in 2014, while being nominated in 2011 and 2012. Josh Charles won the award for Favorite TV Drama Actor in 2014.

Satellite Awards
The Satellite Award is an annual accolade bestowed by the International Press Academy since 1997 in recognition of outstanding achievements in film, television and new media. The Good Wife received various nominations, including Best Television Series – Drama and Best Actress – Television Series Drama for Julianna Margulies.

Screen Actors Guild Awards
The Screen Actors Guild Award is an annual accolade presented by the Screen Actors Guild‐American Federation of Television and Radio Artists (SAG-AFTRA) for outstanding individual and ensemble performances in film and television. Julianna Margulies won the award for Outstanding Performance by a Female Actor in a Drama Series in 2009 and 2010 while receiving nominations in 2011, 2012 and 2014. The cast of The Good Wife received nominations for Outstanding Performance by an Ensemble in a Drama Series from 2009-2011.

TCA Awards
Awarded since 1984, the TCA Award is an annual accolade presented by the Television Critics Association in recognition of excellence in television. Out of 8 nominations, The Good Wife has won two TCA Awards – one for Individual Achievement in Drama, awarded to Julianna Margulies in 2010, and one for Outstanding Achievement in Drama in 2014.

Writers Guild of America Awards

Presented by the Writers Guild of America (WGA), the Writers Guild of America Award is an annual accolade that recognizes outstanding achievement of writers in film, television, radio, promotional writing and videogames. Receiving seven nominations during its tenure, The Good Wife won the Writers Guild of America Award for Television: Episodic Drama for the episode "The Last Call" in 2014.

Young Artist Awards
The Young Artist Award is an annual accolade presented by the Young Artist Association in recognition of outstanding achievements by performers aged 5 to 21 in film, television, theater and music. Makenzie Vega received nominations in 2010 and 2011 for her role in The Good Wife, while Graham Phillips was nominated for Best Performance in a TV Series (Comedy or Drama) - Supporting Young Actor in 2011.

Other awards

References

External links
 Awards won by The Good Wife at IMDb

Lists of awards by television series
Awards and nominations